Zoë Ferraris is an American novelist. She was born in Oklahoma. In 1991 she married a man from Saudi Arabia. She lived in Jeddah, Saudi Arabia, with her in-laws for nine months. Her time in Saudi Arabia is the background for the three novels she has written. She has also written a children's novel.

Books

Nayir ash-Sharqi and Katya Hijazi series
 Finding Nouf (2008) follows main character Nayir ash-Sharqi, a Palestinian guide, as he attempts to solve the murder of a young girl. The girl went missing three days before what was to be her arranged marriage.  In the UK the book was published under the title "The night of the Mi'raj". 
 City of Veils (2010) also features characters Nayir ash-Sharqi and Katya Hijazi, both featured in Finding Nouf. This time they are investigating the murder of a young woman whose body was discovered washed up on a beach. The victim, Leila Nawar, was a film-maker working on a subversive film about the Qur'an's origins.  The Guardian critic and crime writer Laura Wilson recommended Ferraris's second novel as one of the best fiction books of 2010.  
 Kingdom of Strangers: A Novel (2012)

Other
 Galaxy Pirates: Hunt for the Pyxis (2015)

Awards
In 2009, Ferraris won an Alex Award for Finding Nouf.

Finding Nouf also won the 2008 Los Angeles Times Book Prize in the Art Seidenbaum Award for First Fiction category.

References

External links
 Official website

Year of birth missing (living people)
Living people
21st-century American novelists
American crime fiction writers
American women novelists
Novelists from Oklahoma
21st-century American women writers
Women crime fiction writers